Orsima is a genus of jumping spiders that was first described by Eugène Louis Simon in 1901.  it contains only three species, found only in Africa, Indonesia, and Malaysia: O. constricta, O. ichneumon, and O. thaleri. O. ichneumon was considered a Polyrhachis ant mimic in reverse, but this theory was later dismissed.

References

Salticidae genera
Salticidae
Spiders of Africa
Spiders of Asia